Aust is a surname. Notable people with the surname include:

Abner M. Aust (1921-2020), American air force officer
Charlie Aust (1942-2017), Rhodesian army officer
Dennis Aust, (born 1940), American baseball player
Kurt Aust (born 1955), Danish writer
Otto Aust (1892-1943), Swedish olympist and sailor
Stefan Aust (born 1946), German journalist

German-language surnames
Surnames from given names